Lance Hinson is an American football coach.  He is currently the head football coach at the University of Saint Mary in Leavenworth, Kansas from 2005 to 2013, and has again taken over duties starting with the 2020 season.  Between his two tenures at Saint Mary, he was head coach at McMurry University in Abilene, Texas from 2014 through 2018.

Coaching career

Assistant coaching
Hinson worked at several schools as an undergraduate/graduate coaching assistant and later as an assistant coach.  While an assistant coach at Baker University his team completed a 9–2 season, recorded a victory in the KWTO Bowl and finished ranked #15 in the nation among NAIA schools.

Saint Mary
Hinson was the head football coach for the Saint Mary Spires located in Leavenworth, Kansas and has held that position since 2005.  Hinson is the third person to take the post, and his overall coaching record at Saint Mary's is 36 wins, 56 losses, and 0 ties.  Hinson was named to the post after the sudden resignation of Scott Frear

Hinson had been with the program since 2002 when he joined the squad as an assistant coach.  Although his teams have not produced stellar performances, each and every year his squad performs above the expectations of peers and sportswriters and this success has helped the school to build a new football/soccer complex, allowing football to be played on campus for the first time in the school's history.   Hinson's teams tend to be stronger on defense rather than offense, and this has become a part of his coaching strategy.

In 2005, Hinson was named Kansas Collegiate Athletic Conference "Co-Coach" of the year along with then Tabor coach Mike Gardner.

In 2009, the National Association of Intercollegiate Athletics selected Hinson as head coach for the College Fanz Senior Classic, an NAIA post-season game to highlight senior players across the country.

McMurry
In 2014, Hinson was named the head coach at McMurry University in Abilene, Texas.  He held the position of head coach from 2014 through 2018, and his tenure was highlighted by two key victories:  His first game was a win over NCAA Division I Houston Baptist and followed that with an upset of NCAA II traditional powerhouse Texas A&M-Kingsville.  Hinson resigned after the conclusion of the 2018 season, having helped guide the program from NCAA Division II to NCAA Division III.  His career at McMurray was 12 wins and 35 losses.

Return to Saint Mary
After a year as Assistant Athletic Director at Saint Mary's, Hinson once again took the position as head coach after the 2019 season was concluded.

Personal life
Hinson lives in Abilene, Tx, and is married to his wife, Andi. He has three children, Jake, Holly, and Lily. Hinson earned a Bachelor of Science in Kinesiology and Psychology from the University of North Texas and a Master of Arts at Baker University.

Head coaching record

References

External links
 Saint Mary profile

Year of birth missing (living people)
Living people
Baker Wildcats football coaches
McMurry War Hawks football coaches
North Texas Mean Green football coaches
Saint Mary Spires football coaches
Sportspeople from Muskogee, Oklahoma